Ajay Menon is an Indian film cinematographer, producer, and photographer who works in Malayalam films. Ajay made his debut as cinematographer with Halal Love Story (2020).

Papaya Media 
Ajay Menon is associating with Papaya media, which is a film production company based in Kochi, Kerala, and Cafe Papaya, a restaurant in Kochi.

Filmography

As cinematographer

References

External links
 Ajay Menon on Imdb
 Official website
 

Living people
People from Palakkad
1983 births